Luis Alejandro Núñez (born 3 May 1980 in San Lorenzo) is a Paraguayan footballer who last played for Sportivo Luqueño.

Núñez was included in the Paraguay national football team at the 2001 Copa America.

References

External links
 
 

1980 births
Living people
People from San Lorenzo, Paraguay
Paraguayan footballers
Association football midfielders
Sportivo Luqueño players
The Strongest players
12 de Octubre Football Club players
Paraguayan Primera División players
Bolivian Primera División players
Paraguay international footballers
2001 Copa América players
Paraguayan expatriate footballers
Paraguayan expatriate sportspeople in Bolivia
Expatriate footballers in Bolivia